Victor Eric 'Strand' Kruger (born 19 January 1989 in Welkom) is a South African rugby union player, currently playing with Rustenburg-based club side Impala. His regular position is lock.

Career

Youth and Varsity Cup
He was part of the  squad that played in the 2007 Under-19 Provincial Championship competition. He was included in the  squad for the 2008 Under-19 Provincial Championship competition and in the  squad for the 2009 and 2010 Under-21 Provincial Championship competitions.

Leopards
His first class debut only came in 2011, when he started in the  v Leopards match in the 2011 Vodacom Cup. Due to his involvement in the Varsity Cup, he only made a further two appearances in that competition, both in 2011. He broke into the team's Currie Cup team for the 2012 Currie Cup First Division.

Griquas
He joined  in 2013 on a short-term contract, following a series of injuries to Griquas locks.

Boland Cavaliers
He joined Wellington-based side  prior to the 2014 season.

Rustenburg Impala
In 2015, he moved to Rustenburg for work reasons and joined the defending SARU Community Cup champions, Rustenburg Impala.

References

1989 births
Living people
Griquas (rugby union) players
Leopards (rugby union) players
Rugby union players from Welkom
South African rugby union players
Rugby union locks